Naomi Mugo (born 2 January 1977, in Nyahururu) is a Kenyan middle-distance runner who specializes in the 1500 metres and cross-country running.

She was the 1999 winner of the Cross Internacional de Soria competition.

International competitions

Personal bests
1500 metres – 3:58.12 min (1998)
3000 metres – 8:43.55 min (2000)
5000 metres – 15:25.13 min (2000)

References

External links

Pace Sports Management

1977 births
Living people
People from Nyandarua County
Kenyan female middle-distance runners
Kenyan female long-distance runners
Olympic athletes of Kenya
Athletes (track and field) at the 1996 Summer Olympics
Athletes (track and field) at the 2000 Summer Olympics
Commonwealth Games competitors for Kenya
Athletes (track and field) at the 1998 Commonwealth Games
Athletes (track and field) at the 2002 Commonwealth Games
World Athletics Championships athletes for Kenya
African Games bronze medalists for Kenya
African Games medalists in athletics (track and field)
Kenyan female cross country runners
Athletes (track and field) at the 2003 All-Africa Games
20th-century Kenyan women
21st-century Kenyan women